East Face may refer to:
 East Face (Mount Whitney), California, United States
 Kangshung Face, of Mount Everest